Makkaraperunat (Finnish for "sausage potatoes") is a street food dish popular in Finland and elsewhere. The dish consists of french fries and slices of sausage, which can be deep-fried in fat or fried in the oven and is served with condiments.

The amount of condiments in the dish and the quality of the dish depends on the particular street food kiosk. Condiments traditionally used in the dish include mustard, ketchup, onion, garlic, pickle relish and mayonnaise.

In Jyväskylä, the dish is known as taksari, short for "taksimiehen erikoinen" ("taxi driver's special"), in Rovaniemi as "makkaraherkku" ("sausage delight") and in Kuopio as sitä sun tätä ("this and that").

References

Finnish cuisine
Fast food